Herbie Husker is the oldest current mascot of the Nebraska Cornhuskers. Herbie was created by Lubbock-based artist Dirk West and first appeared on the cover of the Huskers' media guide in 1974. Soon after, he became the university's official mascot. Herbie frequently travels to academic and athletic events at the University of Nebraska–Lincoln, and often appears at events throughout Lincoln.

History

The University of Nebraska–Lincoln cycled through several official mascots before settling on Herbie Husker. The first of these was Corncob Man, a man in green overalls with an ear of corn for a head. After just a few years, the university sought a more "representative" mascot and debuted Huskie the Husker, a farmer who stood ten feet tall and wore overalls with a straw hat on top of a fiberglass head. Huskie soon gave way to Mr. Big Red (more commonly known as Harry Husker); Harry was equally tall but dressed in a blazer and red wide-brim hat. Harry's head was so large it couldn't fit on the team's traveling bus, and it was so heavy the student wearing the costume had to be switched every 45 minutes.

The physical demands of the Harry costume meant the university was soon looking for another mascot design, and in 1974 NU acquired the rights to Herbie Husker based on the design of Lubbock, Texas artist Dirk West. NU hired Disney cartoonist Bob Johnson to refine West's design into a costume, and Herbie made his first appearance at a Nebraska football game at the 1974 Cotton Bowl Classic, a 19–3 Cornhuskers victory over Texas. Mr. Big Red wasn't officially retired until 1988, but was infrequently seen while co-existing with Herbie.

Historically, Herbie had blond hair and dressed in denim overalls (with an ear of corn in the pocket), a white undershirt, and a red cowboy hat. Prior to the 2003 season, Herbie's appearance was altered to include a red workshirt, blue jeans, and workboots in an effort to update the overall appearance of the state's agricultural workers and general public; however, the new design was not well-received.

Nebraska holds open tryouts prior to each football season for students who wish to dress as Herbie for the academic year. The students who are selected are encouraged to keep their identity a secret until after graduation, though this is not a requirement. Since 1994, Herbie has often been joined on the sideline by the inflatable Lil' Red, Nebraska's other official mascot. Initially, Lil' Red was created to appeal to younger fans and to primarily represent the school's volleyball team, which occasionally played at the same time as Nebraska's football team. However, the mascots are now frequently seen together across all sports.

In January 2005, Herbie starred in his own children's book, Hello, Herbie Husker!, published by Mascot Books.

Herbie was named the 2005 National Mascot of the year at halftime of the 2006 Capital One Bowl.

In 2022, the university modified Herbie's left hand in its classic logo to avoid association with a perceived hate symbol.

References

Big Ten Conference mascots
Nebraska Cornhuskers